Farnworth is a town in Greater Manchester, England. It may also refer to:

People
 Farnworth (surname), a surname of English origin

Places
 Farnworth, Cheshire, an area of Widnes, Cheshire, England

Other uses
 Farnworth & Bold railway station, a former railway station in Farnworth, Widnes, Cheshire
 Farnworth (UK Parliament constituency), a former constituency in Lancashire, later in Greater Manchester
 Farnworth Grammar School, a former school in Farnworth in Greater Manchester
 Farnworth railway station, a railway station serving Farnworth in Greater Manchester
 Municipal Borough of Farnworth, the former local authority for the town of Farnworth, now in Greater Manchester 
 SS Farnworth, the original name used for a steamship between 1917 and 1924

See also
 Farnsworth (disambiguation)